Luke Cole (born 7 November 1993) is an English rugby union player, who plays for Rotherham Titans in the RFU Championship.

Cole was part of Yorkshire Carnegie academy where he was an unused replacement for the game against Rotherham during the 2014-15 season but was dual-registered to Otley where he impressed everyone with his ability on the ball and carrying. Cole moved down south England to Gloucester Rugby academy system during the 2015-16 season.

On 6 May 2016, he signed his first professional contract with Rotherham Titans from the 2016-17 season. On 21 March 2018, Cole signed for Championship rivals Nottingham ahead of the 2018-19 season.

Current coaching placement is with Halifax RUFC as head coach trying to bring a new brand of rugby to the struggling but thriving Yorkshire 4 team. Luke's efforts this season and the rest of the coaching staff at the club have taken the team from strength to strength.

References

External links
Gloucester Rugby Profile

1993 births
Living people
English rugby union players
Gloucester Rugby players
Halifax RUFC coaches
Leeds Tykes players
Rugby union hookers
Rugby union players from Halifax, West Yorkshire